Kilgi is a village in Lääneranna Parish, Pärnu County, in southwestern Estonia. It has a population of 11 (as of 1 January 2011).

Ännikse–Kilgi–Vaiste railway line for lumber transport operated from 1919 to 1950.

Writer Karl Ristikivi (1912–1977) was born in Pärnamaa village which is now part of Kilgi village.

References

Villages in Pärnu County